Abbey Rose Thickson (born June 17, 2000) is a Canadian-born actress, who is originally from Selkirk, Manitoba. She played the character Gretl in the musical The Sound of Music and also starred in the movie The Divide. The producer Darryn Welch praised Thickson for her role in the latter movie.

Filmography

References

External links
 

American actresses
2000 births
Living people
American child actresses
21st-century American women